Clintonville is an unincorporated community in Oakland County in the U.S. state of Michigan.  The community is located within Waterford Township.  As an unincorporated community, Clintonville has no legally defined area or population statistics of its own, and it uses the Waterford 48328 ZIP Code.

It was located along the Clinton River on what today is Walton Boulevard between Clintonville Road and Sashabaw Road.  The village was built on the shores of Wormer Lake (27.5 acres) and Schoolhouse Lake (37 acres).

History
Clintonville was first settled in 1830 by Samuel C. Munson. That same year, Munson built a gristmill and saw mill at Clintonville on Pond Lake (now Lake Oakland), just north of where the Clinton River meets Walton Boulevard today.

Clintonville was platted in 1847.

Early residents
Clintonville land tract owners in 1872 include:
John Linderman (1794-1877)
Marcus Riker (1800-1884)
W. Walker
John Van Campen (1824-1910)
J. Bogardus
Mrs. Stuart
B. Greening
J. Greening

Post Office
Clintonville had a post office from 1898 until 1902.

School
Clintonville School No.7 was the first school in Clintonville.  It was built on the banks of Schoolhouse Lake on what today is 3101 Walton Blvd. in Waterford, Michigan near Clintonville Road. The school building still stands today.

Streets
In 1872, east-west streets in Clintonville were Lafayette Street, Main Street, Columbia Street, Darkman Street, Margaret Street and Elizabeth Street.
North-south streets were Van Buren Street, Jackson Street, Washington Street, Franklin Street, Mill Street, and Pontiac Street.

References

Sources

External links

Unincorporated communities in Oakland County, Michigan
Unincorporated communities in Michigan
Metro Detroit
1830 establishments in Michigan Territory
Populated places established in 1830